Ángel Gustavo Partida Arévalo (born 15 March 1989) is a Mexican former professional footballer who last played for Loros de la Universidad de Colima.

References

1989 births
Living people
Tecos F.C. footballers
Coras de Nayarit F.C. footballers
Loros UdeC footballers
Liga MX players
Ascenso MX players
Liga Premier de México players
Footballers from Jalisco
People from Zapopan, Jalisco
Association football midfielders
Mexican footballers